Magnolia sargentiana is a species of flowering plant in the family Magnoliaceae. It is endemic to China, where it occurs in Sichuan and Yunnan. It is widely distributed but its populations are fragmented.

This is a forest tree which grows 8 to 25 meters tall. It is harvested for wood and herbal medicine.

References

External links
 Friedman, William (Ned). "Two stunners worth finding". Posts from the Collections, Arnold Arboretum of Harvard University website, 21 April 2019. Accessed 21 April 2020.

sargentiana
Endemic flora of China
Flora of Sichuan
Flora of Yunnan
Trees of China